Égyptienne is a Swiss serif typeface belonging to the classification slab serif, or Egyptian, where the serifs are unbracketed and similar in weight to the horizontal strokes of the letters. Egyptienne was designed in 1956 by Adrian Frutiger for the Fonderie Deberny et Peignot and was the first new text face created for the process of phototypesetting. 

The x-height is high, and some lowercase characters, especially a and e bear comparison with other Frutiger typefaces, especially Meridien and Serifa. Egyptienne shows historical influence of the Clarendon faces.

Égyptienne commonly appears on Chocolate letters.

References

 Friedl, Frederich, Nicholas Ott and Bernard Stein. Typography: An Encyclopedic Survey of Type Design and Techniques Through History. Black Dog & Leventhal: 1998. .
 Macmillan, Neil. An A–Z of Type Designers. Yale University Press: 2006. .

External links

Linotype typefaces
Slab serif typefaces
Typefaces and fonts introduced in 1956
Letterpress typefaces
Photocomposition typefaces
Digital typefaces
Typefaces designed by Adrian Frutiger